Whangapoua is a small settlement of mostly holiday houses located on the Coromandel Peninsula of New Zealand. It is situated 25 minutes drive east over the Coromandel Range from Coromandel along the northeastern coastline encompassing popular white sand beaches New Chums Beach, Matarangi, Kuaotunu Beach and Otama Beach.

Amenities in Whangapoua include a small wharf and boat ramp, and a general store that also supplies petrol and diesel. The nearby estuary provides further water access for boats. Whangapoua Beach is a safe 1.5&km long sandy swimming beach flanked in the north by the rocky foreshore towards Motuto Point and by Te Rehutae Point in the southeast.

The northern end of Whangapoua Beach is the starting point of a partly unformed track to New Chums Beach - that beach is only accessible via this track at low tide or by boat. The nearest school is in Te Rerenga.

History

Whangapoua's Māori history dates back to the 13th century. A reserve at Opera Point, east of Whangapoua, contains the remains of the Raukawa pa site. European settlers started arriving in the 1860s, drawn to the area chiefly for kauri milling and gold mining.

Today, Whangapoua is spread along behind the beach and consists of about 120 permanent residents, but can swell to over 1000 with holiday residents during the most popular holiday period from late December to February.

Demographics
Whangapoua is described by Statistics New Zealand as a rural settlement. Whangapoua is part of the larger Mercury Bay North statistical area.

Whangapoua had a population of 75 at the 2018 New Zealand census, an increase of 33 people (78.6%) since the 2013 census, and an increase of 21 people (38.9%) since the 2006 census. There were 33 households, comprising 42 males and 36 females, giving a sex ratio of 1.17 males per female. The median age was 61.0 years (compared with 37.4 years nationally), with 12 people (16.0%) aged under 15 years, 6 (8.0%) aged 15 to 29, 21 (28.0%) aged 30 to 64, and 36 (48.0%) aged 65 or older.

Ethnicities were 84.0% European/Pākehā, 16.0% Māori, and 8.0% other ethnicities. People may identify with more than one ethnicity.

Although some people chose not to answer the census's question about religious affiliation, 60.0% had no religion and 32.0% were Christian.

Of those at least 15 years old, 12 (19.0%) people had a bachelor's or higher degree, and 12 (19.0%) people had no formal qualifications. The median income was $21,100, compared with $31,800 nationally. 3 people (4.8%) earned over $70,000 compared to 17.2% nationally. The employment status of those at least 15 was that 15 (23.8%) people were employed full-time, 6 (9.5%) were part-time, and 3 (4.8%) were unemployed.

References

Thames-Coromandel District
Populated places in Waikato